Łukasz Kalinowski (born January 17, 1983 in Brodnica) is a Polish footballer (midfielder) who played in the 2006–07 II liga (renamed I liga) with Unia Janikowo. His previous club was Jeziorak Iława.

Clubs 
 2000–2001: Sparta Brodnica
 2001–2002: Naprzód Jabłonowo Pomorskie
 2003-2006: Jeziorak Iława
 2006–2009: Unia Janikowo
 2009: Rol.Ko Konojady
 2010: Sparta Brodnica
 2010: Rol.Ko Konojady

External links
 

1983 births
Living people
Polish footballers
Sparta Brodnica players
Jeziorak Iława players
Unia Janikowo players
People from Brodnica County
Sportspeople from Kuyavian-Pomeranian Voivodeship
Association football midfielders
I liga players